This was the first edition of the tournament. 

Alycia Parks won the title, defeating Rebecca Peterson in the final, 6–1, 6–4.

Seeds

Draw

Finals

Top half

Bottom half

References

External Links
Draw

2022 WTA 125 tournaments